The 2016 World Draughts Championship match  at the international draughts was held from December 3–18 in the Netherlands under auspice International Draughts Federation FMJD. The match was scheduled to take place between Jan Groenendijk and Roel Boomstra, who were second and third at last Draughts Championship. World Champion Alexander Georgiev (Russia) has informed FMJD that he will not defend his title. FMJD decided that the next player in the classifications of last WC, Roel Boomstra, should play the Match for World Title against the Vice Champion, Jan Groenendijk.

Roel Boomstra won this match with score 16–8 and became World Draughts Champion.

Results

See also
List of Draughts World Championship winners

References

External links
Site 2016 World Draughts Championship match

2016 in draughts
Draughts world championships
2016 in Dutch sport
International sports competitions hosted by the Netherlands
December 2016 sports events in Europe